Henry Louis Hasse (February 7, 1913 – May 20, 1977) was an American science fiction author and fan.  He is probably known best for being the co-author of Ray Bradbury's first professionally published story, "Pendulum", which appeared in November 1941 in Super Science Stories. Hasse co-authored two more published stories with Bradbury: "Gabriel's Horn" (1943) and "Final Victim" (1946).

Hasse's novelette "He Who Shrank" is anthologized in both the classic 1946 collection Adventures in Time and Space, edited by Raymond J. Healy and J. Francis McComas, and in Isaac Asimov's memoir of 1930s science fiction Before the Golden Age.

References

Several short stories by Hasse are available at  manybooks.net

External links
 
 
 

1913 births
1977 deaths
American science fiction writers
American male short story writers
20th-century American novelists
American male novelists
20th-century American short story writers
20th-century American male writers